The Lesser Antillean saltator (Saltator albicollis) is a species of songbird in the tanager family Thraupidae that is found in Dominica, Martinique, Saint Kitts and Nevis, and Saint Lucia. Its natural habitats are subtropical or tropical dry forests and heavily degraded former forest.

References

Lesser Antillean saltator
Birds of the Lesser Antilles
Lesser Antillean saltator
Taxa named by Louis Jean Pierre Vieillot
Taxonomy articles created by Polbot